Cable theft may refer to:

 Metal theft, the theft of physical electrical cable for its scrap metal value
 Cable television piracy, a form of copyright infringement which provides free subscription television